LEB or Leb may refer to:
 Lausanne–Echallens–Bercher railway, Switzerland
 Lea Bridge railway station, London, England (National Rail station code)
 Lebanon, UNDP country code 
 Lebanon Municipal Airport (New Hampshire) (FAA identifier)
 Lexham English Bible
 Life expectancy at birth
 Liga Española de Baloncesto, Spanish basketball league
 London Electricity Board, UK
 FBI Law Enforcement Bulletin
 Leb, slang for a Lebanese Australian

See also
The Lebs, 2018 comic novel by Michael Mohammed Ahmad